Eva Braak (1939-2000) was a German anatomist, mostly known for the Braak and Braak Alzheimer disease stages. She was professor at the Institute of Clinical Neuroanatomy, Johann Wolfgang Goethe-University, Frankfurt am Main.

Career
Eva Braak and her husband, Heiko Braak, were in charge of a group investigating new techniques in the study of degenerative diseases of the brain
In the 1970s, Braak and her husband implemented and perfected the than-new silver-iodate histological technique to study relatively thick sections of whole brains, up to 150 microns. Using those methods, they contributed extensively to the neuropathology of Alzheimer's and Parkinson's diseases. In 1987, Braak and her husband were the first to describe the pathological changes of argyrophilic grain disease, an unknown tauopathy which was previously marked as senile dementia. A few years later, in 1991, they introduced a classification of Alzheimer's disease into six distinct pathoanatomical stages, now commonly known as Braak and Braak stages, based on the topographical distribution pattern of neurofibrillary changes from circumscribed parts of the limbic system to the higher neocortical association fields.
Eva Braak was the first female scientist to receive an Award for Life-time Achievements in Alzheimer's Disease Research, granted during the Sixth International Conference on Alzheimer's Disease and related Disorders, in 1998.

Death
She died of ovarian cancer on 25 August 2000 in Frankfurt am Main.

References 

Alzheimer's disease researchers
German anatomists
German neuroscientists
Physicians from Frankfurt
Parkinson's disease researchers
Women anatomists
1939 births
German medical researchers
Academic staff of Goethe University Frankfurt
German women physicians
2000 deaths